Attorney General Young may refer to:

Alfred Karney Young (1864–1942), Attorney General of British East Africa and Attorney-General of Fiji
Charles Young (governor) (1812–after 1875), Attorney General of the Colony of Prince Edward Island
David Young (Ontario politician) (born 1957), Attorney General of Ontario
Edward T. Young (1858–1940), Attorney General of Minnesota

See also
General Young (disambiguation)